Fairfax High School is a rural secondary school (grades 7-12) in Fairfax, Atchison County, Missouri.

District
Fairfax High School is part of the Fairfax R-III School District. Fairfax Elementary School (K-6) feeds into Fairfax High School.

See also 
 List of high schools in Missouri

References

External links 

Public high schools in Missouri
Public middle schools in Missouri
Schools in Atchison County, Missouri